João Marcos Quintanilha Pires Fernandes (born 22 August 1991), known as João Marcos, is a Brazilian professional footballer who played as a midfielder for Dutch club Fortuna Sittard in the 2010–11 season. Previously he played at Botafogo de Futebol e Regatas.

References

External links
Voetbal International 

1991 births
Living people
Brazilian footballers
Association football midfielders
Fortuna Sittard players
CSM Corona Brașov footballers
Liga I players
Eerste Divisie players
Brazilian expatriate footballers
Expatriate footballers in the Netherlands
Footballers from Rio de Janeiro (city)